Peter Buckman is an English writer and literary agent.  He has been involved in the publishing industry for many years; he was on the editorial board of Penguin Books, and a commissioning editor for the New American Library in New York City.  He has published novels, non fiction, a biography and short stories, and has also written for television and film, including an episode of Inspector Morse, three episodes of The House of Elliot, the television film Unnatural Causes, and the television movie The Tale of Sweeney Todd, which was directed by John Schlesinger. He is currently a literary agent, having started The Ampersand Agency in 2003, notable for having discovered and represented Vikas Swarup, author of Q & A, which was filmed as Slumdog Millionaire, and also being the agent for the estate of prolific historical fiction writer Georgette Heyer.

Bibliography

Fiction
 Playground: A Game of Fiction (1971)
 The Rothschild Conversion (1979)

Non fiction
 The Limits of Protest  (1970)
 Education Without Schools (1973) (as Editor)
 Let's Dance: Social, Ballroom & Folk Dancing (1978)
 All for Love: A Study in Soap Opera (1984)
 A Genial Senior's Companion to Ageing (2018)

Biography
 Lafayette: A Biography (1977)

References

External links
 

Living people
20th-century English novelists
English television writers
Place of birth missing (living people)
Year of birth missing (living people)
English male novelists
20th-century English male writers
British male television writers